Norsk Soyamelfabrikk was a soy flour manufacturing company in Larvik, Norway. It was established in 1933, and was closed down in the 1970s.

References

Food and drink companies established in 1933
1933 establishments in Norway
Companies disestablished in the 1970s
Manufacturing companies of Norway
Companies based in Vestfold
Larvik
Food and drink companies of Norway
Defunct companies of Norway
1970s disestablishments in Norway